GO Corporation was founded in 1987 to create portable computers, an operating system, and software with a pen-based user interface. It was famous not only for its pioneering work in Pen-based computing but as well as being one of the most well-funded start-up companies of its time.

Its founders were Jerry Kaplan, Robert Carr, and Kevin Doren. Mr. Kaplan subsequently chronicled the history of the company in his book Startup: A Silicon Valley Adventure. Omid Kordestani, former Senior VP of Global Business at Google, began his startup career with GO Corporation. Other notable GO alumni include CEO Bill Campbell (who later became chairman of Intuit), VP Sales Stratton Sclavos (took VeriSign public as its CEO), CFO and VP of Business Operations Randy Komisar (became CEO of LucasArts), and VP Marketing Mike Homer (was VP Marketing at time of Netscape's IPO in 1995).

History
Though the company enjoyed high levels of public awareness and generally positive attention from industry press, it ran into fierce competition, first from Microsoft (whose Pen Services for Windows were later the subject of an FTC investigation and patent violation suits by GO), and later from Apple's Newton project, and others. The company lined up software development partners but struggled to deliver hardware and software on their intended schedule. In 1991, they spun off their hardware unit under the name EO Inc., and in 1993 EO was acquired by AT&T Corporation, who hoped that its devices would showcase their AT&T Hobbit microprocessors. This sale raised much-needed cash but introduced new problems, as EO then ceased to coordinate well with GO's management, even considering adopting competing operating systems. Facing a cash crisis, GO agreed to sell itself to AT&T as well, bringing the two halves of the company back under one roof as of January 1994.

GO's PenPoint OS ran on AT&T's EO Personal Communicator and computers from IBM and others, but despite some success in vertical markets, consumers in the 1990s did not adopt tablet computing as enthusiastically as GO management had expected. (GO produced a 286-based lightweight "Go Computer" specifically for developers and evaluators; the company emphasis was that end users would run PenPoint OS on third-party hardware.) In January 1994, only two weeks after acquiring GO, AT&T decided to cancel the Hobbit product line, leaving it no reason to continue to support EO or GO. They had by then ceased to develop for other chips, and sales on the other platforms were small anyway. Co-founder Jerry Kaplan says that in its lifetime, the company generated "no meaningful sales". The loss of AT&T's support left GO with little chance of future revenue and, after burning through $75 million of venture funding, the company closed in July 1994.

Lawsuits
On 29 June 2005, Kaplan filed an antitrust lawsuit against Microsoft, alleging that Microsoft technicians had stolen technology from GO that had been shown to them under a non-disclosure agreement.

In a separate legal matter, in April 2008 certain features of the Microsoft's Windows/Tablet PC operating system and hardware were found to infringe on a patent by GO Corporation concerning user interfaces for pen computers.

See also
Apple Newton
PenPoint OS
Pen computing
History of tablet computers

Notes

References

 - Contains two chapters dealing with the GO story from a view inside Microsoft.

External links
IDEO - Company that helped develop the EO Personal Communicator, based on the PenPoint operating system.
Annotated bibliography of references to handwriting recognition, gestures and pen computing
 Notes on the History of Pen-based Computing (YouTube)

American companies established in 1987
American companies disestablished in 1994
Computer companies established in 1987
Computer companies disestablished in 1994
Defunct computer companies of the United States
Defunct software companies of the United States